Karl Harst (1492–1563) was a sixteenth-century Alsatian diplomat of the Duchy of Cleves and humanist. He was acquainted with Erasmus and adopted Erasism, being his assistant and courier.

Biography
He was educated in Cologne, Orléans, and Leuven.

Between 1524 and 1526, he was Erasmus's assistant; he was sent to Italy, the Low Countries, and the Kingdom of England. In 1526, he sent to Italy to retrieve a Greek manuscript of John Chrysostom's Homilies on Acts. This venture was supported by Reginald Pole due to Erasmus's connection to him and was ultimately successful. From Greek manuscripts collected by Harst and Hieronymus Froben, Erasmus published Lucubrationes in March 1527.

Since 1530, Harst was in service of the Duke of Cleves. In a 1539 letter from Johannes Altenanus to Bonifacius Amerbach, Harst was described as their friend and John III, Duke of Cleves's ambassador to Charles V, Holy Roman Emperor in Habsburg Spain. He was representative in London during the marriage of Henry VIII of England and his fourth wife, Anne of Cleves in 1540 and remained there until 1544.

References

Bibliography

1492 births
1563 deaths
16th-century German people
People of the Tudor period
German Renaissance humanists
German diplomats
Diplomats of former countries